Machaeroides ("dagger-like") is an extinct genus of sabre-toothed predatory placental mammals from extinct subfamily Machaeroidinae within extinct family Oxyaenidae, that lived in North America (Wyoming) from the early to middle Eocene.

Description
Both species bore a passing or superficial resemblance to a very small, dog-sized saber-toothed cat. Machaeroides could be distinguished from actual saber-toothed cats by their more-elongated skulls, and their plantigrade stance. Machaeroides species are distinguished from the closely related Apataelurus by the fact that the former genus had smaller saber-teeth. Despite its small size, the genus Machairoides was well-equipped to hunt prey larger than itself, such as the small, primitive horses and rhinoceroses present at the time, as it was equipped with saber teeth and powerful forelimbs to subdue prey.

M. eothen weighed an estimated , thus matching in size a small Staffordshire Terrier. M. simpsoni was probably smaller.

Taxonomic placement
Its position within the mammals has been in dispute. Experts have been equally divided over whether Machaeroides and its sister-genus, Apataelurus, belong in Oxyaenidae or Hyaenodonta, though the most recent studies favor the former.

Phylogeny
The phylogenetic relationships of the genus Machaeroides are shown in the following cladogram.

See also
 Mammal classification
 Machaeroidinae

References

Oxyaenidae
Eocene mammals of North America
Prehistoric placental genera
Paleogene geology of Wyoming
Eocene genus first appearances
Eocene genus extinctions
Paleontology in Wyoming